Karen Hearn  is a British art historian and curator. She has Master's degrees from the University of Cambridge and the University of London. She is an Honorary Professor in the Department of English Language and Literature at the University College London. From 1992 to 2012 Hearn was the Curator of 16th & 17th Century British Art at the Tate where she curated major exhibitions on Tudor and Jacobean paintings, Anthony van Dyck, and Rubens. She was co-curator of Royalist Refugees at The Rubenshuis in Antwerp.  She has also curated recent exhibitions at The National Portrait Gallery in London, The Harley Gallery, and The Foundling Museum. She was elected as a Fellow of the Society of Antiquaries of London on 1 January 2005.

She researches, writes, teaches, lectures and broadcasts on art produced in Britain between about 1500 and about 1710, and in particular on the numerous Netherlandish-British artistic and cross-cultural links of that period. One long-standing focus is the life and work of the 17th-century portrait-painter Cornelius Johnson [Cornelis Jonson van Ceulen]; she is currently working on a full-scale Johnson monograph.

Hearn also writes on the British career of Anthony van Dyck. In 2009 she curated the major Tate Britain exhibition ‘Van Dyck & Britain’, and has subsequently published a key essay on his London studio/workshop (2018).

For many years she has taught at university level on the centrality of migrant artists to 16th- and 17th-century (Tudor and Stuart period) British art.

Select publications
1995. Karen Hearn ed., Dynasties: Painting in Tudor and Jacobean England 1530-1630 (London: Tate, 1995).
1998. "Henry Gibbs: Painter and Gentleman", Burlington Magazine (February 1998), 99-101.
2004. "Merchant Patrons for the Painter Siberechts", in Galinou, Mireille (ed) City Merchants and the Arts 1670-1720. Wetherby.
2004. 'A question of Judgement: Lucy Harington, Countess of Bedford as Art Patron & Collector' in Edward Chaney ed., Evolution of English Collecting (Yale, 2004).
2005. Nathaniel Bacon: Artist, Gentleman, Gardener. London, Tate Publishing.
2009. "Lady Anne Clifford's "Great Triptych"", in Hearn, K. and Hulse, L. (eds) Lady Anne Clifford: Culture, Patronage and Gender in Seventeenth-Century Britain. Leeds. 1-24.
2009. Karen Hearn ed., Van Dyck & Britain (London: Tate, 2009).
2015. "'Picture-drawer, born at Antwerp': Migrant Artists in Jacobean London", in Painting in Britain 1500-1630: Production, Influences & Patronage. London, British Academy. 278-287.
2015. Cornelius Johnson (London, Paul Holberton: 2015)
2019. "'Wrought with flowers and leaves': Embroidery Depicted in Late Sixteenth- and Early Seventeenth-Century British Portraits – the Era of Rubens", in Lieneke Nijkamp & Abigail D. Newman (eds) Undressing Rubens: Fashion and Painting in Seventeenth-Century Antwerp. London & Turnhout. 31-46.
2020. Portraying Pregnancy: From Holbein to Social Media (London, Paul Holberton: 2020).

References

External links
 Karen Hearn, Early Modern Exchanges, UCL

Living people
British art historians
Year of birth missing (living people)
Fellows of the Society of Antiquaries of London
Women art historians
21st-century British historians
British women historians
People associated with the Tate galleries
Alumni of the University of Cambridge
Alumni of the University of London